The Oxford School of Drama is a drama school in the United Kingdom. It is based at Wootton, ten miles north of Oxford.

The school is an independent, vocational drama school which runs a three-year acting course and a one-year acting course, both validated by Trinity College, London. It also runs six-month foundation courses in acting. Students on the three-year and one-year courses are eligible for funding from the Government's Dance and Drama Award Scheme and Advanced Learning Loans.

The school is governed by a board of trustees, which includes Thelma Holt, Nina Raine, Nicholas Allott and Jeremy Sams. It is a member of the Federation of Drama Schools.

Alumni

Ritu Arya
Will Adamsdale
Lydia Rose Bewley
Lee Boardman
Freddy Carter
Christina Cole
Samantha Colley
Sophie Cookson
Alexandra Dowling
Claire Foy
Anna Galvin
Lauren Harris
Nell Hudson
Nicola Coughlan 
Michael Lieber
Louise Marwood
Catherine McCormack
Declan O'Dwyer
Annabel Scholey
Penelope Skinner
Catherine Steadman
Vanessa Claire Stewart
Charity Wakefield
Anna Walton
Richard Gadd
Tanya Reynolds

References

External links

 
Drama schools in the United Kingdom
Further education colleges in Oxfordshire
Culture in Oxfordshire
Woodstock, Oxfordshire